This is a list of flag bearers who have represented New Zealand at the Olympics.

Flag bearers carry the New Zealand flag and, since 2004, wear Te Māhutonga cloak at the opening ceremony of the Olympic Games.

Arthur Porritt, Stuart Blakely and David Aspin are the only New Zealand Olympians to have carried the flag at two different Olympic opening ceremonies.

Te Māhutonga cloak
This is worn by New Zealand's Olympic flag bearer at the opening ceremony of Summer and Winter Olympic Games. The Maori feather cloak is a traditional textile that offers the distinguished wearer additional mana through its connection with the previous sportspeople who have worn it. It was first worn to the games by Beatrice Faumuina at the 2004 Athens Olympic Games after being presented by the Maori Queen Dame Te Atairangikaahu in a ceremony where it also adorned some of the previous flag bearers including Harold Nelson, Ian Ferguson, Mark Todd, Barbara Kendall and Blyth Tait. Te Māhutonga translates from Māori to represent the constellation of the Southern Cross.

Opening ceremony flag bearers

competed under New Zealand Olympic Committee flag

Closing ceremony flag bearers

See also
New Zealand at the Olympics
List of flag bearers for Australasia at the Olympics

References

New Zealand at the Olympics
New Zealand
Oly